Theodore Bevry Olson (born September 11, 1940) is an American lawyer who served as the 42nd solicitor general of the United States from 2001 until 2004. Previously, Olson served as the United States Assistant Attorney General of the Office of Legal Counsel (1981–1984) under President Ronald Reagan. He remains a practicing attorney at the law firm of Gibson, Dunn & Crutcher.

Early life
Theodore Olson was born in Chicago, the son of Yvonne Lucy (Bevry) and Lester W. Olson. He grew up in Mountain View, California, in the San Francisco Bay Area. He attended Los Altos High School where he graduated in 1958. In 1962, Olson graduated cum laude from the University of the Pacific with a degree in communications and history where he was a charter member of the Phi Kappa Tau fraternity chapter. He earned his J.D. degree from the UC Berkeley School of Law in 1965. At Berkeley, Olson served as a contributor to the California Law Review and was a member of Order of the Coif.

Legal career

Early legal career: 1965 to 2000
In 1965, Olson joined the Los Angeles, California, office of Gibson, Dunn & Crutcher as an Associate. In 1972, he was named Partner.

From 1981 to 1984, Olson served as an Assistant Attorney General (Office of Legal Counsel) in the Reagan administration. While serving in the Reagan administration, Olson was Legal Counsel to President Reagan during the Iran-Contra Affair's investigation phase.
Olson was also the Assistant Attorney General for the Office of Legal Counsel when then President Ronald Reagan ordered the Administrator of the EPA to withhold the documents on the ground that they contained "enforcement sensitive information." This led to an investigation by the House Judiciary Committee that later produced a report suggesting Olson had given false and misleading testimony before a House subcommittee during the investigation. The Judiciary Committee forwarded a copy of the report to the Attorney General, requesting the appointment of an independent counsel investigation.

Olson argued that the Independent Counsel took executive powers away from the office of the President of the United States and created a hybrid "fourth branch" of government that was ultimately answerable to no one. He argued that the broad powers of the Independent Counsel could be easily abused or corrupted by partisanship. In the Supreme Court Case Morrison v. Olson, the Court disagreed with Olson and found in favor of the Plaintiff and independent counsel Alexia Morrison.

He returned to private law practice as a partner in the Washington, D.C., office of his firm, Gibson Dunn.

A high-profile client in the 1980s was Jonathan Pollard, who had been convicted of selling government secrets to Israel. Olson handled the appeal to United States Court of Appeals for the D.C. Circuit. Olson argued the life sentence Pollard received was in violation of the plea bargain agreement, which had specifically excluded a life sentence. Olson also argued that the violation of the plea bargain was grounds for a mistrial. The Court of Appeals ruled (2‑1) that no grounds for mistrial existed.

Olson argued a dozen cases before the Supreme Court prior to becoming Solicitor General. In one case, he argued against federal sentencing guidelines; and, in a case in New York state, he defended a member of the press who had first leaked the Anita Hill story. Olson successfully represented presidential candidate George W. Bush in the Supreme Court case Bush v. Gore, which effectively ended the recount of the contested 2000 Presidential election.

Later legal career: 2001 to present
Olson was nominated for the office of Solicitor General by President Bush on February 14, 2001. He was confirmed by the United States Senate on May 24, 2001, and took office on June 11, 2001. In 2002, Olson argued for the federal government in the Supreme Court case Christopher v. Harbury (536 U.S. 403). Olson maintained that the government had an inherent right to lie: “There are lots of different situations where the government quite legitimately may have reasons to give false information out.”  In July 2004, Olson retired as Solicitor General and returned to private practice at the Washington office of Gibson Dunn.

In 2006, Olson represented a defendant journalist in the civil case filed by Wen Ho Lee and pursued the appeal to the Supreme Court. Lee sued the federal government to discover which public officials had named him as a suspect to journalists before he had been charged. Olson wrote a brief on behalf of one of the journalists involved in the case, saying that journalists should not have to identify confidential sources, even if subpoenaed by a court. In 2011, Olson represented the National Football League Players Association in the 2011 NFL lockout.

In 2009, he joined with President Clinton's former attorney David Boies, who was also his opposing counsel in Bush v. Gore, to bring a federal lawsuit, Perry v. Schwarzenegger, challenging Proposition 8, a California state constitutional amendment banning same-sex marriage. His work on the lawsuit earned him a place among the Time 100's greatest thinkers. In 2011, Olson and David Boies were awarded the ABA Medal, the highest award of the American Bar Association. In 2014, Olson received the Golden Plate Award of the American Academy of Achievement presented by Awards Council member Brendan V. Sullivan, Jr.

Apple Inc. hired Olson to fight the FBI–Apple encryption dispute court order to unlock an iPhone, which ended with the government withdrawing its case.

Olson also represented New England Patriots quarterback Tom Brady in the Deflategate scandal, which ended with Brady electing not to pursue Supreme Court appeal of a four-game suspension.

In 2017, Olson represented a group of billboard advertisers in a lawsuit against the City of San Francisco. The group challenged a city law requiring soda companies to include in their advertisements warnings that consumption of sugar-sweetened beverages is associated with serious health risks like diabetes. The suit claimed that the law is an unconstitutional restriction on commercial speech. In September 2017, a panel of the 9th Circuit Court of Appeals agreed with Olson and provisionally barred the city's mandated warnings.

In March 2018, Olson turned down an offer to represent Donald Trump in the probe of Russian interference in the 2016 election.

In November 2019, Olson represented the DACA recipients in the Supreme court case Department of Homeland Security v. Regents of the University of California. On June 18, the Supreme Court upheld the program due to the failure of the Trump Administration to follow the Administrative Procedure Act while rescinding DACA.

Olson was solicitor general during the 9/11 terrorist attacks, and his wife died on board the plane that was used to crash into the Pentagon. In 2023, Olson wrote in an op-ed that the U.S. should conclude the criminal cases of the remaining defendants. Citing the complicated nature of death penalty cases, as well as the fact that many of the convictions already secured had been partially or fully overturn by appeals courts, he publicly encouraged the government to offer sentences of life in prison.

Personal life 
Olson has been married four times. His first marriage was to Karen Beatie whom he met in college at the University of the Pacific. Olson's second wife was Jolie Ann Bales, an attorney and a liberal Democrat. Olson's third wife, Barbara Kay Olson (née Bracher), an attorney and conservative commentator, was a passenger aboard the hijacked American Airlines Flight 77 that crashed into a sector of the Pentagon on September 11, 2001. Her original plan was to fly to California on September 10, but she delayed her departure until the next morning so she could wake up with her husband on his birthday. Before she died, she called her husband to warn him about the flight. Some of the phone call was recorded and can still be heard. On October 21, 2006, Olson married Lady Evelyn Booth, a tax attorney from Kentucky and a lifelong Democrat.

Politics 
Olson was a founding member of the Federalist Society. He has served on the board of directors of American Spectator magazine. Olson was a prominent critic of Bill Clinton's presidency, and he helped prepare the attorneys of Paula Jones prior to their Supreme Court appearance. Olson served Giuliani's 2008 presidential campaign as judicial committee chairman. In 2012 he participated in Paul Ryan's preparation for the vice presidential debate, portraying Joe Biden. He is one of the outspoken advocates for gay marriage in the Republican Party.

Executive appointment speculation 

Prior to President Bush's nomination of D.C. Circuit Court of Appeals Judge John G. Roberts, Olson was considered a potential nominee to the Supreme Court of the United States to fill Sandra Day O'Connor's post. Following the withdrawal of Harriet Miers' nomination for that post, and prior to the nomination of Third Circuit Court of Appeals Judge Samuel Alito, Olson's name was again mentioned as a possible nominee.

In September 2007, Olson was considered by the Bush administration for the post of Attorney General to succeed Alberto Gonzales. The Democrats, however, were so vehemently opposed that Bush nominated Michael Mukasey instead.

References

Bibliography

External links 

 Gibson, Dunn & Crutcher profile
 Dept. of Justice biography
 
 Campaign contributions made by Theodore Olson

1940 births
Living people
California Republicans
California lawyers
Federalist Society members
George W. Bush administration personnel
Lawyers from Chicago
Lawyers from Washington, D.C.
American LGBT rights activists
People associated with Gibson Dunn
Reagan administration personnel
The American Spectator people
United States Assistant Attorneys General for the Office of Legal Counsel
United States Solicitors General
UC Berkeley School of Law alumni
University of the Pacific (United States) alumni
Whitewater controversy